Vivekananda Vidya Mandir is an English Medium co-educational school from Kindergarten to Class XII. The school is affiliated to the Central Board of Secondary Education, New Delhi. It is one of the oldest  and premier CBSE Senior secondary School at HEC Campus in Ranchi, Jharkhand. The school was established by Sri Ramakrishna Seva Sangha, the foundation of which was laid on the day of Rath Yatra in the year 1970 on the plot of land allotted by the authorities of the Heavy Engineering Corporation Limited, Dhurwa, Ranchi. The school is situated around 3 KM from Hatia Railway Station.

Motto 
The motto of the school is "Tapah – Prabhaavaad deve prassadaachaha" from Svetasvatara Upanishad, and it points out that the Self is realized by the power of one’s experience and grace of God.

History 
In 1963, the birth centenary Year of Swami Vivekananda, a group of devotees of the Ramakrishna Mission in the Heavy Engineering Corporation complex at Dhurwa, Ranchi formed an association named Sri Ramakrishna Seva Sangha for Self-realization through worship and selfless service. They had the guidance of Srimat Swami Vedantanandaji Maharaj, the Founder-Secretary of the Ramakrishna Mission TB Sanatorium, Dungri, Ranchi. The first principal appointed was Mr. Subal Basu.

Overview 
The present principal of the school is Mrs. Kiran Dwivedi and President is Mr. Kashi Nath Mukherjee. The school has more than 2000 students and is spread over six acres including six laboratories for Physics, Chemistry, Biology, Computer Science, Composite Science and Home Science along with two libraries.

Campus 
The school has Grooming labs, Smart Classes, Auditoriums, Modern Libraries, Math Labs, Music Room, Fine Art Room, Meditation Hall, Modern Audio Visual Room and many more. The school has indoor games facilities and also houses a large playground of area around 12000 square metre.

Gallery

References

Private schools in Jharkhand
Schools in Ranchi
Educational institutions established in 1970
1970 establishments in Bihar